York is an unincorporated community in Rabun County, in the U.S. state of Georgia.

History
The community most likely was named after York, in England.

References

Unincorporated communities in Georgia (U.S. state)
Unincorporated communities in Rabun County, Georgia